The discography of KT Tunstall, a Scottish rock/folk music singer, includes seven studio albums, and twenty-three singles.

KT Tunstall's debut album, Eye to the Telescope, was released in December 2004, and sold four million copies worldwide. The album produced two top twenty singles in the United Kingdom and was certified five times platinum. In 2005, it was nominated for the Mercury Prize, an annual music prize awarded for the best album from the United Kingdom or Ireland. Tunstall's song "Black Horse and the Cherry Tree" was nominated for Best Female Pop Vocal Performance at the 49th Grammy Awards in 2007.

In May 2006, Tunstall released an acoustic collection album, KT Tunstall's Acoustic Extravaganza, a CD and a DVD comprising songs from her debut and unreleased material. Her second studio album, Drastic Fantastic, was released in September 2007. The album has produced three singles and has sold 215,000 copies in the United States. Her third studio album Tiger Suit was released in 2010, followed by an EP "The Scarlet Tulip EP", released on 8 April 2011. On 10 June 2013, Tunstall released her fourth studio album Invisible Empire // Crescent Moon. Critically acclaimed, it was preceded by lead single "Feel It All" and other singles: "Invisible Empire" and "Made of Glass".

Her fifth studio album, Kin was released on 9 September 2016. Golden State EP, with its lead single "Evil Eye" was released on 16 June 2016 to promote the album. Tunstall released and directed the music video.

Tunstall also wrote various soundtracks for movies. On 2014, she also wrote "Miracle" as an official soundtrack single for the film Winter's Tale, and "We Could Be Kings" for Million Dollar Arm.

Albums

Studio albums

Compilation/Collection albums

Live albums

Demo albums

Extended plays

Singles

Notes

Soundtracks

Music videos

Other appearances 
These songs have not appeared on a studio album released by Tunstall.

References

External links

Discographies of British artists
Rock music discographies
Discography